KRUS (1490 AM) is a radio station licensed to serve the community of Ruston, Louisiana. The station is owned by Red Peach LLC, and airs a gospel music format.

The station was assigned the KRUS call letters by the Federal Communications Commission on December 17, 1947.

References

External links
 Official Website
 FCC Public Inspection File for KRUS
 FCC History Card for KRUS
 

Radio stations established in 1947
1947 establishments in Louisiana
Gospel radio stations in the United States
Lincoln Parish, Louisiana
Christian radio stations in Louisiana